In mathematics, Minkowski's second theorem is a result in the geometry of numbers about the values taken by a norm on a lattice and the volume of its fundamental cell.

Setting
Let  be a closed convex centrally symmetric body of positive finite volume in -dimensional Euclidean space .

Conversely, given a norm  on  we define  to be

We have .

Statement
The successive minima satisfy

Proof 

Then the coordinate transform  has a Jacobian determinant . Therefore,  must be enclosed in a primitive cell of the lattice (which has volume ), and consequently .

References

 
 
 
 
 

 
Hermann Minkowski